Balykty Sarkyl is a brackish lake in Kaztal  District, West Kazakhstan Region, Kazakhstan.

Geography
Balykty Sarkyl lies between the Maly Uzen and the Bolshoy Uzen rivers of the Ural basin. The lake is roughly hourglass-shaped with the northern part larger than the southern.

Balykty Sarkyl freezes in November and thaws in early April. River Ozek flows into the lake from the southern end. The lake is located in a semidesert area, to the north of the Kamys-Samar Lakes.

See also
List of lakes of Kazakhstan

References

External links

Dominant species of macrozoobenthos of studied lakes
Tourism and recreational potential of the salt lakes of Western Kazakhstan

Lakes of Kazakhstan
West Kazakhstan Region
Ural basin